Reginald Courtenay DD (1813–1906) was the Anglican Bishop of Jamaica from 1856 until 1879.

He was educated at Tonbridge School and Hertford College, Oxford and ordained in 1841. He was Rector of Thornton Watlass from 1842 to 1853 when he became Archdeacon of Middlesex (Jamaica), a post he held until his 1856 consecration to the episcopate as coadjutor bishop (called Bishop of Kingston) of Jamaica. He automatically succeeded as diocesan Bishop of Jamaica upon Aubrey Spencer's death, 24 February 1872.

References

1813 births
People educated at Tonbridge School
Alumni of Hertford College, Oxford
Archdeacons of Middlesex, Jamaica
19th-century Anglican bishops in the Caribbean
Anglican bishops of Jamaica
1906 deaths
British expatriate bishops